The 12th Mounted Rifles were a light cavalry regiment of the Royal Prussian Army. The regiment was formed 1 October 1913 in St. Avold.

See also
List of Imperial German cavalry regiments

References

Mounted Rifles of the Prussian Army
Military units and formations established in 1913
1913 establishments in Germany